Brydan Klein won this event. He defeated Jonathan Eysseric 6–2, 4–6, 6–1 in the final.

Seeds

Draw

Final eight

Top half

Section 1

Section 2

Bottom half

Section 3

Section 4

External links
Main Draw
Qualifying Draw î

Boys' Singles
Australian Open, 2007 Boys' Singles